Miss World Spain 2020 was the 8th edition of the Miss World Spain pageant. The winner was Ana García Segundo of Almería and she represented Spain at Miss World 2021.

Final results

Placements

Challenge Events

Beauty with a Purpose

Multimedia

Top Model

Sports

Talent

Regional Costume

Public Vote

Judges
Francisco Fajardo - President/Head of the Judges
Mireia Lalaguna Royo - Miss World Spain 2015 from Barcelona & Miss World 2015 from Spain
Cuca Miquel
Carlos Pérez Gimeno
Daniel Carnade
David Cabaleiro
Jorge Borrajo
Rachid Mohamed
Andrea Ventulori

Official Delegates
The delegates for Miss World Spain 2020 are:

Notes

Replacements
 Ávila - Carmen Díaz replaced Roció Santos.
 La Coruña - Maria Gundín replaced Marta Martinez.
 Murcia - Isabel Bolet replaced Yolanda Ortiz.
 Soria - Eve Denayer replaced Elianny Cuevas.

Withdrawals
 Canary Islands

Did not compete
 Aragón
 Extremadura
 Galicia

References

External links
 Miss World Spain Official Website

Miss Spain
2020 in Spain
2020 beauty pageants